Imperial German secret agent Lieutenant Robert Fay arrived in New York in April 1915 with a mission to sink freight ships on the East Coast of America during World War I. He was arrested in October of 1915.

Early life

Robert Fay had worked at the Submarine Signal Company (a company that would eventually merge with Raytheon Company) in Boston before the war and spoke English fluently. He also had family, brother-in-law Walter E. Scholz, who lived in New Jersey.

Mission to America

Robert Fay was serving on the Western Front during WWI when he came up with the idea of a time bomb design that disabled rudders on munitions ships. In an American harbour, the explosive would be installed on the rudder using a small boat. His superiors liked the idea and after finding out about his time in America set him up with a fake British passport under the name of H. A. Kearling and $4,000 (US$  in ). He arrived in New York City on April 23, 1915.  

He was assigned German Foreign Office military attaché Franz von Papen as his handler. Working with Paul Daeche, Walter E. Scholz, Otto Wolpert, Max Breitung and Dr. Herbert O. Kienzle they tried to buy explosives. They eventually made contact with a German-American chemist who was secretly working as a double agent for the U.S. Secret Service. They set up a sting operation offering to provide the explosives, eventually arresting Fay, Scholz, Kienzle, and Daeche on October 24, 1915.

See also

List of German spies
List of German sponsored acts of terrorism during WWI

Bibliography
Notes

References 
  - Total pages: 96 
 
 - Total pages: 264
  - Total pages: 460 
 - Total pages: 240

German spies
World War I spies for Germany